4147 Lennon, provisional designation , is a stony Vestian asteroid and a potentially slow rotator from the inner regions of the asteroid belt, approximately 7 kilometers in diameter. It was discovered by American astronomer Brian Skiff at Lowell's Anderson Mesa Station on 12 January 1983. It was later named after musician John Lennon.

Orbit and classification 

Lennon is a member of the Vesta family, which is named after the main-belt's second largest asteroid, 4 Vesta. It orbits the Sun in the inner main-belt at a distance of 2.2–2.6 AU once every 3 years and 8 months (1,326 days). Its orbit has an eccentricity of 0.08 and an inclination of 6° with respect to the ecliptic. The first observation was made at Crimea–Nauchnij in 1971, extending the asteroid's observation arc by 12 years prior to its discovery.

Physical characteristics 

Lennon has been characterized as a V-type asteroid.

Slow rotator 

In October 2004, a rotational lightcurve of Lennon was obtained during a photometric survey of V-type asteroids at several observatories in Japan. The fragmentary lightcurve gave a very long rotation period of 137 hours with a high brightness variation of 0.6 in magnitude.

Diameter and albedo 

According to the survey carried out by NASA's Wide-field Infrared Survey Explorer with its subsequent NEOWISE mission, Lennon measures 5.2 and 7.1 kilometers in diameter and its surface has an albedo of 0.24 of 0.42, respectively. The Collaborative Asteroid Lightcurve Link assumes a standard albedo for S-type asteroids of 0.20 and calculates a diameter of 7.5 kilometers with an absolute magnitude of 13.0. The discrepancy is due to disagreement on the body's spectral type (V or S).

Naming 

This minor planet was named in memory of English musician John Lennon (1940–1980), famous for his song "Imagine" and co-founder of The Beatles, one of the most successful bands in the history of popular music.

The minor planets 8749 Beatles, 4149 Harrison, 4148 McCartney and 4150 Starr, were named after the band and its three other members. The official naming citation was published by the Minor Planet Center on 10 April 1990.

References

External links 
 Asteroid Lightcurve Database (LCDB), query form (info )
 Dictionary of Minor Planet Names, Google books
 Asteroids and comets rotation curves, CdR – Observatoire de Genève, Raoul Behrend
 Discovery Circumstances: Numbered Minor Planets (1)-(5000) – Minor Planet Center
 
 

004147
Discoveries by Brian A. Skiff
Named minor planets
19830112